Lorrie A. Shepard is a University Distinguished Professor of research and evaluation methodology and former Dean of the School of Education at the University of Colorado Boulder. She joined the faculty of UC-Boulder in 1974, and was named the dean of the School of Education there in 2001. She retired from her position as School of Education Dean in 2016, but remains a distinguished professor there. She has been the president of the National Academy of Education, the American Educational Research Association, and the National Council on Measurement in Education. She has also been editor-in-chief of the Journal of Educational Measurement and the American Educational Research Journal. She is known for her work on psychometrics and the use of testing in the educational system. She has also researched the effects of grade retention in schools, and has argued that it is ineffective at improving student performance.

References

External links
Faculty page

Living people
Educational psychologists
American education writers
American women psychologists
University of Colorado Boulder faculty
Pomona College alumni
University of Colorado Boulder alumni
Academic journal editors
Year of birth missing (living people)
21st-century American women
American educational psychologists